Hancun Township is a township of Xinshi District, Baoding, Hebei, People's Republic of China. , it has nine villages under its administration.

See also
List of township-level divisions of Hebei

References

Township-level divisions of Hebei
Jingxiu District